Khaled Jamal Al-Radaideh (born March 13, 1995) is a Jordanian footballer who plays as a defender for Al-Ahli.

References

External links 

Association football midfielders
1995 births
Jordanian footballers
Living people
Al-Ahli SC (Amman) players